Vlakhernskoye-Kuzminki is an estate formerly belonging to the Stroganov and Golitsyn families of the Russian nobility. Today, it is incorporated into Kuzminki-Lyublino historical park located in Moscow's Kuzminki District. The estate was named after the Icon of Theotokos Vlakhernskaya, a replica of which was kept in the estate church.

History 
In 1702 Peter the Great granted the estate to Grigori Stroganov. No buildings were erected on the property until after the death of the first owner in 1714. The new owner, Alexander Stroganov, began construction on the estate; in 1754 the estate passed to his widow. After the marriage of her daughter Anna in 1757 to Prince Mikhail M. Golitsyn (1731–1804), the property passed to the Golitsyn family.

After the Revolution 
In 1917 the mansion was nationalized and given to the Institute of experimental veterinary medicine, which later became the All-Union Scientific Research Institute of Experimental Veterinary Medicine in Petrograd and occupied the building until 2001. During the following decades, Kuzminki fell into disrepair and decay. Many buildings were rebuilt and converted into laboratories, residential and administrative buildings.

Today, it is the largest manor house in Moscow by number of buildings (currently over 20), a considerable part of which are newly built ones.

The Manor house 
The manor house was rebuilt several times in the second half of the 18th century. Side wings are connected with the main house by two semi-circular galleries. In the 1830s, the entrance of the manor court was decorated with iron candelabra and griffins, designed by J. Colombo. The manor house and its western wing burned down in 1916.

The Estate Church 

The church of the Blachernae Icon of Theotokos is located at the heart of the estate. 

The church was closed in 1929 by order of the government and many of its ceremonial items were removed, the bell tower was also ruined and the building itself was badly damaged. The church and the bell tower were restored in 1995 under the guidance of Yelena Vorontsova.

The Riding Court 
The Riding Court on the left bank of the Upper Pond near the dam was built in 1805. It was rebuilt in 1823 by architect Domenico Gilardi.

In 1978, the building of the Music Pavilion burnt down and the other premises of the Riding Court were abandoned. In the early 2000s, the entire complex of the courtyard was restored.

On 28 January 2019, a wooden ceiling collapsed in the Riding Court premises.

Views of Kuzminki by J.Rauh, 1820s - 1840s

References

External links 
 Photo (1024x768)
  Photos
  History
  Official site of the church of Vlakhernskaya Icon of the Theotokos
  History and map
  Paintings of the estate in the 1840s
 Kuzminki - Photo Album - Photos and digital paintings of the Kuzminki District (Moscow, Russia). (English, Russian)
 Museum of Russian Estate Culture (Moscow)
 Church of the Blachernitissa Icon of the Theotokos in Kuzminki (Moscow)

Museums in Moscow
Palaces in Moscow
Churches in Moscow
Golitsyn family
Parks and gardens in Moscow
Churches completed in 1715
18th-century Eastern Orthodox church buildings
1715 establishments in Russia
Cultural heritage monuments of federal significance in Moscow